Share My Love is the second studio album by Gloria Jones, released in 1973. Dedicated to the memory of Gloria's friend, Lee Jacobs. It was received well by critics and the Motown industry, however was not promoted, as Gloria decided instead to work with Marc Bolan and T. Rex.

In a 2002 interview, conducted by James Ellis, Gloria was quoted: "I had just finished recording an album called Share My Love for Motown and the manager called me and said he wanted to book me into the Continental in LA, where Bette Midler had just broken. I got a call from Marc and he said: 'I need you to come and help me finish an album in Germany.' I made the decision to go with him. I sent my management a telegram from Germany saying: 'Sorry, I'm in love.' "

Share My Love was given its first official CD release in March 2009.

Track listing 
Side One

"Share My Love" (Gloria Jones, Janie Bradford) 6:45
"Why Can't You Be Mine" (Gloria Jones, Beverly Gardner) 3:25
"Try Love" (Gloria Jones, Raymond Gibson, Addison Terry) 5:00
"Tin Can People" (Gloria Jones, Beverly Gardner) 2:30

Side Two

"Oh Baby" (Richard Jones, Andre Moore, Delton Williams) 3:30
"Old Love, New Love" (Gloria Jones) 4:15
"So Tired (Of The Way You're Treating Our Love Baby)" (Gloria Jones, Paul Riser) 4:20
"Baby Don'tcha Know (I'm Bleeding For You)" (Gloria Jones) 3:10
"What Did I Do To Lose You" (Gloria Jones, Pam Sawyer) 3:05

Production
Produced by Tom Thacker for Corduroy
Arranged by Paul Riser (except "Oh Baby" arranged by Richard Jones, Andre Moore and Paul Riser)
Engineer: John Horton for Cordouroy
Recordists: Gary Ladinsky, Chris Morris, John Henning, Austin Godsey & Lee Kiefer
Photography: Fred Marx (cover), Chuck Leopold (liner)

Personnel 
On "Share My Love", "Why Can't You Be Mine", "So Tired" and "What Did I Do To Lose You"

Stan Seymour, David T. Walker - lead guitar
Roderick "Peanut" Chandler - bass
Jai Winding - keyboards
Hubert Heard - organ
Dale Loyola - drums
Joe Clayton, Bobbye Hall Porter - congos, percussion
Greg Abate, Ernie Fields - tenor saxophone on "Share My Love"
Mike Crawford - trumpet
David Stout - trombone on "So Tired & What Did I Do To Lose You"
Gloria Jones, Oma Drake, Stephanie Spruill - backing vocals

On "Try Love", "Baby Don'tcha Know", "Oh Baby", "Old Love New Love" and "Tin Can People"

Charles Grimes - guitar
Willie Weeks - bass
Jai Winding, Andre Moore, Bill Cuomo - keyboards on "Tin Can People"
Earl Palmer - drums on "Old Love New Love & Baby Don'tcha Know"
Joe Clayton, Sam Clayton - congos
Don Menza - tenor saxophone, flute
Charles Loper - trombone
Chuck Findley, Paul Hubinon - trumpet
Ray Pizzi - baritone saxophone
Neil Levang - mandolin on "Oh Baby"
Gloria Jones, Gwen Edwards, Marsha Smith, Marsha Temmer, Laura Creamer, Oma Drake, Jessica Smith - backing vocals

1973 albums
Gloria Jones albums
Motown albums
albums produced by Paul Riser